The August Horch Museum Zwickau is an automobile museum in Zwickau, Saxony, Germany. Opened in 2004, it covers the history of automobile construction in Zwickau, the home of Horch and Audi prior to World War II, and Trabant during the Cold War-era German Democratic Republic.

The museum is housed within the former factory where August Horch established Audi Automobilwerke GmbH in 1910.  Its owner and operator is a non-profit making company owned in equal shares by Audi AG and the town of Zwickau.

Gallery

See also 
AutoMuseum Volkswagen
Autostadt
List of automobile museums
museum mobile
Porsche Museum

References

Notes

Bibliography

External links 

  
 

Audi
Automobile museums in Germany
European Route of Industrial Heritage Anchor Points
Horch
Museums in Saxony
Zwickau
Museums established in 2004
2004 establishments in Germany